Lee Jong-hyun (born May 15, 1990) is a South Korean musician, singer-songwriter and actor. He was the former lead guitarist and vocalist of South Korean rock band CNBLUE. He made his acting debut in an omnibus movie Acoustic in 2010, followed by his television debut in the Korean drama A Gentleman's Dignity in 2012. He appeared in television dramas  Orange Marmalade (2015), Lingerie Girls’ Generation (2017) and Evergreen (2018).

In August 2019, Lee departed CNBLUE after the backlash over a private direct message towards a YouTuber, and amidst allegations of him viewing illicit videos and having inappropriate sexual conversations degrading women in the Jung Joon-young KakaoTalk chatrooms, a part of Burning Sun scandal.

Life and career

Early life
Lee Jong-hyun was born on May 15, 1990, in Busan, South Korea. His family consists of his parents and two older sisters. He lived in Busan before his family moved to Japan when he was four years old. His family moved back to Busan and he finished his elementary school and middle school there.

He was an ulzzang at "BESTNINE" alongside Mblaq's Lee Joon, fellow member Jung Yong-hwa, and Block B's Jaehyo before debut.

The talent scouter from FNC Music (currently known as FNC Entertainment) who visited Busan to see Jung, came across Lee in the street, and suggested him to audition at the company. On his way to his audition, he met his current fellow CNBLUE member Jung at the Seoul Station. They then met Kang Min-hyuk, also a current fellow member of CNBLUE, at FNC Music where they auditioned. Eventually, only the three of them passed the auditions and Lee began training in bass technology at FNC Academy.

Before Lee embarked on his musical career, he was a judo athlete who won a gold medal in a judo championship amongst athletes in his hometown when he was in high school. However, he decided to give up on sports upon realizing that this was not the field that he would excel in after losing in a match in just a few seconds. He then started to focus on music. At first, he learned singing, then piano. Then, upon watching English singer-songwriter and guitarist Eric Clapton playing the guitar, he was inspired to learn to play the guitar.

Music career

Lee debuted with CNBLUE in South Korea on January 14, 2010 with their lead single "I'm a Loner". Before their Korean debut, they debuted as an indie band, with Lee being the leader, in Japan in August 2009. Jung Yong-hwa then took over his place following the band's Korean debut. They made their major debut in Japan in October 2011.

Lee, together with Jung, composed many of the band's released songs, such as "Blind Love", "Lie", "Rain of Blessing", "Kimio", "My Miracle", "Come On", "No More", "These Days" etc., which all gained positive feedback. "Come On" ranked number 5 on Oricon's Weekly singles chart while "Blind Love" ranked number 4. "Get Away", one of his compositions, was used as the ending theme song for the Japanese broadcast of American TV series Gossip Girl.

Lee released his first solo single "My Love" in 2012, as part of the soundtrack for SBS drama A Gentleman's Dignity, which he starred in. The song was written by Lee himself. "My Love" debuted at number four on the Gaon Digital Chart. It eventually became the 34th best-selling song in South Korea that year with 2,187,150 digital downloads.
The song earned Lee five award nominations, ultimately winning "Best OST" at the 2013 Seoul Music Awards.

In December 2013, Lee and his fellow label-mate Juniel formed a duo called "Romantic J" and released a digital single album titled "Love Falls". Inspired by the movie Music and Lyrics, the song was compose by Lee, with lyrics written by Juniel. The single peaked at #27 on the Melon Chart. The duo subsequently promoted the song through 
Mnet's M Countdown and SBS MTV's The Show.

On August 2, 2015, Lee held his first solo fan meeting in Japan at the Tokyo International Forum and met with 10,000 fans.

Lee made his solo debut in July 2016, with the studio album Sparkling Night. The album debuted at number seven on the weekly Oricon Albums Chart and number nine on Billboard Japan magazine's Hot Albums, eventually selling 13,529 copies. Lee then embarked on the "Welcome to Sparkling Night" tour, his first series of solo concerts. The first two concerts took place from August 9–10 at the Osaka International Convention Center in Osaka, followed by a concert on August 13 at the Nagoya Congress Center in Aichi, and two final concerts from August 17–18 at the Tokyo International Forum in Tokyo.

Acting career
In 2010, Lee made his acting debut in the omnibus film Acoustic alongside fellow member Kang Min-hyuk.

On May 27, 2012, Lee made his small screen debut in SBS weekend drama A Gentleman's Dignity. He earned positive reception for his debut role and won the "New Star" award at the year-end SBS Drama Awards.

In May 2015, Lee starred in the fantasy high-school drama Orange Marmalade, alongside labelmate Seolhyun from AOA, where he plays a vampire. He also joined the fourth season of the Korean reality show We Got Married, pairing with actress Gong Seung-yeon. Shortly after, he reunited with Gong in the youth historical drama My Only Love Song.

In 2017, he starred in the teen drama Lingerie Girls’ Generation in which he played a former gangster of Daegu who turned to be a kindhearted local handy man. The same year, he was cast in the Japanese film Ikiru Machi, which is about the Great East Japan Earthquake in 2011.

In 2018, Lee starred in the fantasy romance drama That Man Oh Soo opposite Kim So-eun.

Controversy and departure

Inside trading of stocks
In June 2016, Lee and fellow CNBLUE member Jung Yong-hwa were accused of insider trading of FNC stocks based on information that their label, (FNC Entertainment), was signing popular comedian, host, and television personality Yoo Jae-suk. While Jung was acquitted of all charges, Lee was fined. Lee apologized and stated that he bought the stocks without verifying the information, but once he realized legal issues could result from the purchase, he held onto the stocks.

Group chat rooms

On March 12, 2019 Lee's agency issued a statement that Lee was not connected to alleged chat rooms and sexual activities, which Jung Joon-young was part of. However, on March 14, it was reported that Lee was involved in the Burning Sun scandal with Jung in a one-to-one chatroom where Jung had shared sexual hidden camera footages of himself as Lee engaged in "inappropriate sexual conversations, and inappropriate conversations degrading women". On March 15, 2019, Lee admitted that he watched sex videos shared by Jung and he had made disparaging remarks about the women filmed. Investigation is still ongoing. In August 2019, Lee departed CNBLUE after the backlash over inappropriate messages he sent to a YouTuber, which brought renewed attention to the Burning Sun issue.

Philanthropy
The proceeds collected from "LEE JONG HYUN Solo Concert in Japan - METROPOLIS" which was held in June 2018 were donated for the Great East Japan Earthquake and the Kumamoto Earthquake through the Japanese Red Cross Society.

Mandatory military service
Lee enlisted in his military service in August 2018.

Lee was officially discharged from his military service on March 25, 2020.

Filmography

Television series

Film

Variety show

Discography

Albums

Singles

Video albums

Song writing and production credits

Awards and nominations

References

 
1990 births
Japanese-language singers of South Korea
K-pop singers
FNC Entertainment artists
English-language singers from South Korea
21st-century South Korean male actors
Living people
People from Busan
South Korean composers
South Korean male idols
South Korean male singers
South Korean pop rock singers
South Korean pop guitarists
South Korean pop singers
South Korean rhythm and blues singers
South Korean rock guitarists
South Korean male television actors
South Korean male web series actors
CNBLUE members
South Korean singer-songwriters
South Korean male film actors
South Korean musicians
School of Performing Arts Seoul alumni
Warner Music Japan artists
South Korean male singer-songwriters